George W. Boyd was an American politician from Mississippi who served on the Warren County board of supervisors and represented the county in the Mississippi House of Representatives in 1874 and 1875.

He was noted after an October 1875 letter describing Democratic Party plans to rig an election.

See also
 African-American officeholders during and following the Reconstruction era

References

Republican Party members of the Mississippi House of Representatives
People from Warren County, Mississippi
African-American state legislators in Mississippi
County supervisors in Mississippi
African-American politicians during the Reconstruction Era
Year of birth missing
Year of death missing